Ochi is a Japanese surname. Notable people with the surname include:

, Japanese singer, model and actress
, Japanese baseball player
, Japanese footballer
Hideo Ochi (born 1940), Japanese karateka
, Japanese footballer
, Japanese politician
, Japanese classical composer and percussionist
, Japanese actor

Japanese-language surnames